Dromore Lough is a freshwater lake in the Mid-West Region of Ireland. It is located in County Clare.

Geography
Dromore Castle lies on the lake's northeastern shore. The lake is located in the townland of Dromore.

Natural history
Fish species in Dromore Lough include perch, rudd, pike and the critically endangered European eel. Bird life at the lake includes little grebe, whooper swan, wigeon, gadwall, teal and tufted duck. The lake is part of the Dromore Woods and Loughs Special Area of Conservation.

See also
List of loughs in Ireland

References

Dromore